Dorstenia brasiliensis is a species of herbaceous plant in the family Moraceae of the order Rosales.

Distribution
The plant is native to northeastern and central South America, across most of Brazil,

Areas it is found include: the Amazon, Atlantic Forest, and Cerrado ecoregions; and off the northeast coast on Trinidad and Tobago.

References

External links

brasiliensis
Flora of northern South America
Flora of Brazil
Flora of the Amazon
Flora of the Atlantic Forest
Flora of the Cerrado
Flora of Argentina
Flora of Bolivia
Flora of Colombia
Flora of French Guiana
Flora of Guyana
Flora of Paraguay
Flora of Peru
Flora of Trinidad and Tobago
Flora of Uruguay
Flora of Venezuela
Plants described in 1786
Taxa named by Jean-Baptiste Lamarck
Flora without expected TNC conservation status